SZP can refer to:

 Sub Zero Project

 Santa Paula Airport
 Służba Zwycięstwu Polski
 Superficial Zone Protein
 Schizophrenia